Gustav Arnold Fiechter (born 18 July 1879 in Sissach; died 5 April 1943 in Basel) was a Swiss painter and teacher at the trade school in Basel.

Biography
Arnold Fiechter grew up with his sister Elise (1875–1962) in Sissach. His mother dies in 1891, and his father, Arnold Fiechter-Niederhauser, married the widow Elisabeth Schneider. A short time later they moved to Basel.

From 1894 to 1897, Fiechter completed an apprenticeship as a flat painter in Sarnen, and worked as a decorative painter in Central Switzerland. He then studied at the Basel vocational school under Fritz Schider. During this time he met Alfred Bloesch (1890–1967), with whom he had a lifelong friendship. At 20 years old, Arnold Fiechter was able to exhibit his watercolors at the Kunsthalle Basel.

External links
 Arnold Fiechter In: Sikart
 Arnold Fiechter in Artnet
 Arnold Fiechter in the personal dictionary of the canton of Basel-Landschaft
Arnold Fiechter in Swisscovery
 Arnold Fiechter in E-Periodica
Arnold Fiechter in the Basel city book

References

19th-century German painters
19th-century German male artists
20th-century German painters
20th-century German male artists
1879 births
1943 deaths